Schönhagen Airport  is a general aviation airport near Trebbin, a town in the German state of Brandenburg.

History

Since 1928 the area around Löwendorfer Berg has been used for gliding. The Luftwaffe der Wehrmacht, which expanded the area from 1936, used Trebbin Air Base as an emergency landing site, no flying units were stationed there. Between 1937 and 1945 a "Reichsschule für Segelflug" of the National Socialist Flyers Corps which operated gliding in Schönhagen, was located at Schönhagen..

In GDR times the site was home to the school combine named "Ernst Schneller" of the Gesellschaft für Sport und Technik which among other things provided basic pilot training in preparation for military pilot training with the NVA. On 31 January 1952 Karl Liebeskind performed the first take-off of an aircraft in the GDR with a SG 38 in Schönhagen.

After the fall of the iron curtain, the airfield was and is being continuously expanded. Both runways were asphalted, the main runway was extended and equipped with a navigation light system.

On 24 November 2008, the last aircraft taking off from Tempelhof landed in Schönhagen

Facilities
The airport is licensed for aeroplanes up to  maximum takeoff weight.

See also
 Transport in Germany
 List of airports in Germany

References

External links

 Official website

Airports established in 1936
Airports in Brandenburg